, Dr. A.P.J. Abdul Kalam Technical University (AKTU), formerly Uttar Pradesh Technical University, has a total of 592 institutes affiliated to it located across 55 districts of Uttar Pradesh. Lucknow district has the higher number of colleges (80), followed by Ghaziabad (63), Gautam Buddha Nagar (56), Meerut (55) and Kanpur Nagar (41), the five districts together accounting for almost half (295) the total number of colleges.

The university has three constituent colleges, three associated colleges and three colleges which have been granted autonomous status.

Colleges by city

List of colleges

Prayagraj

Akbarpur

Aligarh

Allahabad

Amethi

Amroha district

Amroha

Gajraula

Azamgarh

Baghpat

Ballia

Balrampur

Banda

Barabanki

Bareilly

Bhadohi

Bijnor district

Bijnor

Dhampur

Najibabad

Bulandshahr district

Bulandshahr

Khurja

Etawah

Faizabad

Farrukhabad

Fatehpur

Firozabad

Gautam Buddha Nagar district

Dadri

Greater Noida

Noida

Ghaziabad district

Ghaziabad

Modinagar

Muradnagar

Ghazipur

Gonda

Gorakhpur

Hapur district

Garhmukteshwar

Hapur

Hardoi

Hathras

Jaunpur

Jhansi

Kannauj

Kanpur

Kanpur Dehat

Kasganj

Kaushambi

Lalitpur

|| 892
|| Maa Gayatri College of Pharmacy  Lalitpur

Lucknow

Maharajganj

Mainpuri

Mathura

Mau

Meerut

Mirzapur

Moradabad

Muzaffarnagar

Raebareli

Rampur

Saharanpur

Shahjahanpur

Sitapur

Sonbhadra

Sultanpur

Unnao

Varanasi

See also
 Education in Uttar Pradesh
 List of institutions of higher education in Uttar Pradesh

References

Lists of universities and colleges in Uttar Pradesh
Uttar Pradesh Technical University